George William Pipgras (December 20, 1899 – October 19, 1986) was an American right-handed starting pitcher and umpire in Major League Baseball.

Known as "The Danish Viking", he spent most of his playing career with the New York Yankees, breaking in as a rookie in 1923. He spent the 1925 and 1926 seasons in the minor leagues, and became a starter in the rotation for the first time with the legendary  team. Pipgras lead the American League in wins with a 24–13, 3.38 ERA record for the following year's 1928 repeat champions.

After ending his 11-year career with the Boston Red Sox, he became an AL umpire from 1938 to 1946, and was the umpire behind the plate in one of baseball's most dramatic wins ever: on September 30, 1945, at Sportsman's Park in St. Louis, when Hank Greenberg hit a ninth-inning grand slam, after Pipgras suggested to Greenberg the game should be called on account of darkness. However, Greenberg convinced him he could still see the ball, so the game proceeded. The next pitch was hit over the fence and the Detroit Tigers went on to win the pennant and eventually the 1945 World Series over the Chicago Cubs 4–3 in 7 games.

His younger brother Ed pitched briefly for the 1932 Brooklyn Dodgers.

Pitching career

Pipgras was born in Ida Grove, Iowa, and served in World War I with the 25th Army Engineers.

He started his major league career with the Yankees in the  season after being acquired from the Red Sox, making 17 appearances in his first two years. After returning to the minor leagues for two more years, he earned a place in the starting rotation in 1927, posting a 10–3 record for the team still considered by many to be the greatest ever, and winning Game 2 of the 1927 World Series against the Pittsburgh Pirates. In  he led AL pitchers in wins with a 24–13 record, and also in games started (38) and innings pitched (300), while finishing second in strikeouts (139); he followed up with another Game 2 victory in the 1928 World Series against the St. Louis Cardinals as New York swept the NL champions for the second straight year. He was 18–12 as the Yankees slipped to second place in 1929, and 15–15 in 1930 with an AL-leading 3 shutouts. After a 7–6 season in 1931, he bounced back with a 16–7 mark for the  AL champions, and again won his World Series start in Game 3 as the Yankees swept the Chicago Cubs. In that game, Babe Ruth and Lou Gehrig each hit a pair of home runs, including Ruth's renowned "Called Shot." In an eleven-season career, he posted a 102–73 record with 714 strikeouts and a 4.09 earned run average in 1488 innings.

Umpire and scout

In 1938 Pipgras joined the American League umpiring staff. On Opening Day at Yankee Stadium on April 20, Pipgras worked as the third base umpire during a Red Sox-Yankees contest. The historic box score included the names of future Hall of Famers Joe Cronin, Bill Dickey, Joe DiMaggio, Bobby Doerr, Jimmie Foxx, Lefty Grove, Red Ruffing, Lou Gehrig, Joe Gordon and prize rookie Ted Williams as well. Pipgras was the starting pitcher for the Yankees in 1929's Opening Day, and his opponent for the Red Sox that day was Ruffing. According to historians, the unusual feat set by Pipgras is a case unique in major league history. He went on to umpire in the 1944 World Series, as well as the 1940 All-Star Game; he was the home plate umpire for Dick Fowler's no-hitter on September 9, . He also worked as a scout for the Red Sox.

Death

Pipgras died in Gainesville, Florida at the age of 86. He was survived by his wife, Mattie Mae, who died in 2013 at the age of 99.

See also
List of Major League Baseball annual wins leaders

Further reading
 Honig, Donald (1975) Baseball When the Grass Was Real: Baseball from the Twenties to the Forties Told by the Men Who Played It. New York: Coward, McGann & Geoghegan. pp. 126–133. .

External links

Retrosheet
SABR Biography Project
George Pipgras - Baseballbiography.com
Tampa Tribune obituary The Deadball Era

George Pipgras Oral History Interview - National Baseball Hall of Fame Digital Collection

1899 births
1986 deaths
People from Ida Grove, Iowa
Major League Baseball pitchers
New York Yankees players
Boston Red Sox players
Boston Red Sox scouts
Baseball players from Iowa
American League wins champions
United States Army soldiers
United States Army personnel of World War I
Major League Baseball umpires
Madison Greys players
Charleston Pals players
Atlanta Crackers players
St. Paul Saints (AA) players
Nashville Vols players